The 1956 Bathurst 100 was a motor race held at the Mount Panorama Circuit, Bathurst, New South Wales, Australia on 2 April 1956.
It was staged over 26 laps of the 3.875-mile circuit, a total distance of approximately 100 miles.
The race was contested on a handicap basis with the first cars starting 16 minutes and two seconds before the last car, the Maserati 250F of Reg Hunt.
 
The race was won by Lex Davison in a Ferrari, with the Scratch section (disregarding handicaps) won by Reg Hunt driving a Maserati 250F.

Race results

 Organiser: Australian Racing Drivers Club
 Starters: 21

References

Motorsport in Bathurst, New South Wales
Bathurst 100